Mohamed Abdullah al-Kawsi is a Yemeni officer who served as the Interior minister in the Houthi-run government from 28 November 2016 until 10 December 2017.

References 

Living people
Interior ministers of Yemen
Year of birth missing (living people)
People from Dhamar Governorate